Richard French (June 20, 1792 – May 1, 1854) was an American lawyer and politician who served three separate times as a U.S. Representative from Kentucky.

Early life and career
Born near Boonesborough, Kentucky, French attended private schools.
He studied law.
He was admitted to the bar in 1820 and commenced practice in Winchester, Kentucky.
He served as member of the State house of representatives 1820–1826.
He served as judge of the circuit court in 1829.

U.S. House
French was elected as a Jacksonian to the Twenty-fourth Congress (March 4, 1835 – March 3, 1837).
He was an unsuccessful candidate for reelection in 1836 to the Twenty-fifth Congress.
He was an unsuccessful Democratic candidate for Governor of Kentucky in 1840.

French was elected as a Democrat to the Twenty-eighth Congress (March 4, 1843 – March 3, 1845).

French was again elected to the Thirtieth Congress (March 4, 1847 – March 3, 1849).

After Congress
He resumed the practice of law.
He died in Covington, Kentucky, on May 1, 1854.
He was interred in the family burial ground near Mount Sterling, Kentucky.

References

1792 births
1854 deaths
Phillips Exeter Academy alumni
Democratic Party members of the Kentucky House of Representatives
Jacksonian members of the United States House of Representatives from Kentucky
19th-century American politicians
Democratic Party members of the United States House of Representatives from Kentucky